Anne Klein (born Hannah Golofsky; August 3, 1923 – March 19, 1974) was an American fashion designer and businesswoman, the founder and namesake of Anne Klein & Company  (owned by WHP Global as of July 2019).

She co-founded Anne Klein & Company in 1968 with Gunther Oppenheim, and within ten years her designs were being sold in over 750 department stores and boutiques in the USA.

Her design career began in 1937 when she was awarded a scholarship to attend the Traphagen School of Fashion, which led to her first job as a sketcher for dress firms on 7th Avenue.

In 1948 she married clothing manufacturer Ben Klein, with whom she launched the Junior Sophisticates clothing line. Junior Sophisticates offered styles to younger women with smaller figures. Anne Klein was the principal designer at Junior Sophisticates until 1960, when her marriage ended. In 1963, she married her second husband, Matthew "Chip" Rubinstein, and in 1968, they founded Anne Klein & Company at 39th Street. She also opened Anne Klein Studio at 57th Street.

Beginning in 1954 with the Mademoiselle Merit Award, Anne Klein won numerous fashion awards and gained international recognition.

In 1967, she patented a girdle designed for the miniskirt.

In 1973, she was the only woman invited to participate in the Battle of Versailles, a competitive fashion show consisting of five American designers against five French designers, intended to raise money for renovations at Versailles <ref name="fashion"</ref)

On March 19, 1974, Anne Klein died of breast cancer at Mount Sinai Hospital, New York, NY.

Early life and education 

Anne Klein was born August 3, 1923, in Brooklyn, New York, as Hannah Golofski.  Her father, Morris Golofski, owned a fleet of taxicabs; her mother was Esther Golofski. She was known to say that she changed her name from Hannah to Anne because it was more aesthetically pleasing.

It was while studying art at Girls' Commercial High School (now known as Prospect Heights High School) that she discovered her talent for design. Within a year's time, she was employed at her first job in the garment industry with Varden Petites. There, she worked to redesign the firm's collection and introduced a new style of ready-to-wear clothing for young, smaller figured women that would come to be known as "Junior Miss".

In 1937 she was awarded a scholarship to attend the Traphagen School of Fashion which led to her first job as a sketcher for dress firms on 7th Avenue. She started her fashion career while at the Traphagen School of Fashion in New York City, studying between 1937 and 1938.

Fashion Career 1940s and 1950s

In 1940, Anne Klein began making a name for herself as a designer. She first began designing for Maurice Rentner at his business, Maurice Rentner, Inc., which produced ready-to-wear designs for men and women.

In 1944, Anne Klein joined Bonnie Cashin and Claire McCardell to form a female design trio who laid the foundations of American sportswear.

In 1948 she married clothing manufacturer Ben Klein and they launched the Junior Sophisticates label. Junior Sophisticates offered elegant styles to younger women with smaller figures. Anne Klein was the principal designer at Junior Sophisticates until 1960, when her marriage ended. It was during this time of ready-to-wear fashion, "modern" designs for women, and an increase in the number of women in the workplace that Klein was one of the first to introduce, and to become known for, "separates": individual pieces which work together as a whole, as opposed to dresses.

About this time she began winning awards in the fashion industry including:

1954 she was awarded the Mademoiselle Merit Award.

1954 she was awarded the Coty American Fashion Critics Award.

1959 she was awarded the Neiman-Marcus Fashion Award for the first time, leading to international recognition as a fashion designer.

Fashion Career 1960s and 1970s 

In 1960 her marriage to Ben Klein ended, as did her association with Junior Sophisticates.

During the early 1960s, after her divorce from Ben Klein, she kept the name Klein and worked as a freelance designer, reinvigorating well-known but faltering lines such as Pierre Cardin coats and Evan-Picone.

This freelance work helped to fund her 1963 opening of Anne Klein Studio on 57th Street. Also in 1963 she married a second time to Matthew "Chip" Rubenstein.

In 1961 she was one of a select group to win the American Creativity Award.

In 1964 she was awarded the Lord & Taylor Rose Award for independent thinking, an award first given to Albert Einstein.

In 1968, she established the Anne Klein & Company label as director and co-owner with her husband, on 39th Street. The label was opened in collaboration with investor Gunther Oppenheim, a fashion industry stalwart. The next ten years saw an expansion of the business, with over 750 department stores and boutiques in America selling her designs.

In 1969 she was awarded the Neiman-Marcus Fashion Award; she was, later, the first designer to win the award for a second time.

In 1970, Klein opened the first designer shop-in-shop boutique, "Anne Klein Corner" in Saks Fifth Avenue, New York. That year, she was awarded the Coty American Fashion Critics Award, which she would win again. A year later, in 1971, she was named to the Coty Fashion Hall of Fame. The 8th designer to be so inducted in 28 years.

1973 she was included as one of five designers invited to show at the legendary Battle of Versailles design competition. The competition served to raise money for renovations at Versailles.

Death 

March 19, 1974, Anne Klein died at the age of 50 of breast cancer at Mount Sinai Hospital, New York, NY .

The Company 

After Anne Klein died in 1974, Donna Karan and Louis Dell’Olio took over the design direction of the company.

Anne Klein is an American privately held company owned by WHP Global who acquired the brand in July 2019.

Today the brand sells a full lifestyle assortment from apparel, to footwear to watches to jewelry and is sold in 60 countries worldwide.

Awards
 1954 – Mademoiselle Merit Award
 1955, 1969, 1971 – Coty American Fashion Critics Award
 1959, 1969 – Neiman Marcus Award (Klein was the first designer to receive this award twice)
 1964 – Lord & Taylor Award
 1965 – National Cotton Council Award
 1971 – Induction into the Coty Fashion Hall of Fame

References

External links

American Ingenuity: Sportswear 1930s-1970s, an exhibition catalog from The Metropolitan Museum of Art Libraries (fully available online as PDF), which contains material on Anne Klein (see index)

1923 births
1974 deaths
American fashion designers
20th-century American Jews
Deaths from breast cancer
Jewish fashion designers
People from Brooklyn
Traphagen School of Fashion alumni
Women inventors
1940s fashion
1950s fashion
1960s fashion
1970s fashion
American women fashion designers
20th-century American women
20th-century American people